RHHS may refer to:

Randolph-Henry High School, Charlotte Court House, Virginia
Ribston Hall High School, Gloucestershire, UK
Richmond Hill High School (disambiguation), several schools
Richmond Hill High School (Georgia), in Richmond Hill
Richmond Hill High School (Ontario), in Richmond Hill
Richmond Hill High School (Queens), in New York
Ridgeland-Hardeeville High School
River Hill High School, Clarksville, Maryland
Rockwall Heath High School, Heath, Texas
Rock Hill High School (disambiguation), several schools
Rock Hill High School, Ohio
Rock Hill High School, Rock Hill, South Carolina
Rocky Hill High School, Rocky Hill, Connecticut

See also
RHH (disambiguation)